is a Japanese actress, writer, and former gravure idol.

Sakai is represented with Moon the Child, and later A-team. She is left-handed.

Filmography

TV drama

Other TV series

Internet drama

Films

Advertisements

Radio

Stage

Internet

Publications

Photobooks

DVD

Publications

Novels

Essays

Articles

Notes

References

External links
 

Japanese gravure models
1980 births
Living people
Actors from Tochigi Prefecture
20th-century Japanese actresses
21st-century Japanese actresses
21st-century Japanese writers
21st-century Japanese women writers